Negro is a candy originating in Subotica, made by the company founded in 1917 by József Ruff. Originally based in Austria-Hungary, Ruff and his family continued living and working in the Kingdom of Yugoslavia following the dissolution of Austria-Hungary. This brand of candies has been later produced by Pionir (the successor of Ruff's confectionery production) since 1946 in Serbia. In Hungary, it was produced by Győri Keksz until 2019. The product's slogan is "the chimney sweeper of the throat". On its wrapper a chimney sweeper is depicted sweeping a chimney. It gets its originally black colour from active carbon and anise which is similar in taste to licorice, and taste from menthol added. Its full recipe is an industrial secret. 

The name Negro has sometimes been viewed as racist, although no evidence supports this assertion. However, the name refers to its inventor, Pietro Negro, and the word "black" (as the most popular version of the candy is black) is not connected to people of African descent.

References

Hungarian confectionery
Hungarian brands
Serbian confectionery
Serbian brands